Night Calls is the thirteenth studio album by Joe Cocker, released on 7 October 1991.
There were three different editions of the album released in 1991 and 1992. Each of them featured different selections of songs, in different orders, and had different works of cover art. In addition, a DTS edition of the album was released in the UK in 1998, also with a different selection of songs.

Track listing

Personnel 
Credits according to US release track listing.

 Joe Cocker – lead vocals
 Chris Stainton – acoustic piano (1, 12), keyboards (2, 4, 7, 9, 11)
 John Miles – organ (1, 3, 12), tambourine (1), backing vocals (1, 3), keyboards (3), lead guitar (3)
 Rory Kaplan – keyboards (2, 4, 9, 10)
 Greg Phillinganes – keyboards (2, 8, 9)
 Jeff Lynne – multi instruments (5)
 Benmont Tench – Hammond organ (6)
 Ian McLagan – Hammond organ (9)
 David Paich – keyboards (11)
 Phil Grande – guitar (1-4, 6-12)
 Mike Campbell – guitar (5)
 Danny Kortchmar – guitar (7, 11)
 Neil Stubenhaus – bass (1, 3, 12)
 T. M. Stevens – bass (2, 4-11)
 Mike Baird – drums (1, 3, 12)
 Steve Holley – drums (2, 4, 6-11), percussion (4, 6, 9-11), claves (4), tambourine (10)
 Jim Keltner – drums (5)
 Alex Acuña – percussion (2, 4, 6, 9, 10)
 Jim Brock – timbales (2)
 Deric Dyer – saxophone (12)
 Marti Jones – backing vocals (2)
 Girls Talk (Debra Lewis-Brown, Michelle Cross and Geraldine Reid) – backing vocals (2, 4, 6–9)
 Cydney Davis – backing vocals (5, 12)
 Maxine Sharp – backing vocals (5, 12)
 The Water Sisters – backing vocals (7)
 New Life Community Choir – choir (11)
 John P. Kee – choir director (11)

Production
 Producers – Chris Lord-Alge (Tracks 1, 3 & 12); David Tickle (Tracks 2, 4, 6, 8, 9 & 10); Jeff Lynne (Track 5); Danny Kortchmar (Tracks 7 & 11).
 Executive Producer – Roger Davies
 Engineers – Chris Lord-Alge (Tracks 1, 3 & 12); David Tickle (Tracks 2, 4, 6, 8, 9 & 10); Richard Dodd (Track 5); Marc DeSisto (Tracks 7 & 11).
 Assistant Engineers – Rob Hart (Tracks 1, 3 & 12); Greg Goldman and Rick Plank (Tracks 2, 4, 6, 8 & 9); Efren Herrera and Brian Schueble (Track 7).
 Additional recording on Tracks 7 & 11 – David Tickle
 Choir recording on Track 11 – Mark Williams 
 Mixing – Chris Lord-Alge (Tracks 1, 3 & 12); Ron Jacobs and Shelly Yakus (Tracks 2 & 4-11).
 Mix Assistant on Tracks 1 & 3 – Talley Sherwood 
 Recorded at A&M Studios,  The Village Recorder and Rumbo Recorders (Los Angeles, CA); Metropolis Mastering (London, UK).
 Mastered by Stephen Marcussen at Precision Lacquer (Hollywood, CA).
 Production Manager – Ray Neapolitan
 Art Direction – Tommy Steele
 Design – Johnny Lee
 Illustration – Gary Kelley
 Cover Painting – Ana Juan
 Photography – Paul Cox (US); Allan Titmuss (Europe).

Charts

Weekly charts

Year-end charts

Certifications and sales

References

1991 albums
Joe Cocker albums
Capitol Records albums
Albums produced by Jeff Lynne
Albums produced by Chris Lord-Alge
Albums produced by David Tickle